Sheringham railway station is the northern terminus of the Bittern Line in Norfolk, England, serving the town of Sheringham. Its three-letter station code is SHM.

It was opened by British Rail on 2 January 1967 replacing the original station in Sheringham opened by the Midland and Great Northern Joint Railway, which is located across the road, enabling the closure of the level crossing there. The original station subsequently became the terminus of the North Norfolk Railway heritage line. At the time of opening, the railway itself was listed for closure; the basic timber platform provided was intended to cover only the last months of the line's operation.

The station is situated on the southern edge of the town centre, but within walking distance of the beach. It is currently managed by Greater Anglia, which also operates all trains serving it.

Services

Trains operate hourly to Norwich. There are fewer services on Sundays, which alternate every hour between a stopping service (calling at all stations) and a semi-fast service that only calls at Cromer, North Walsham and Hoveton & Wroxham.

Rebuild

With the pending introduction of longer Stadler FLIRT Class 755 units by Abellio Greater Anglia, the temporary station platform was finally scheduled to be replaced.  The replacement platform would be doubled in length, to 80 metres, and fitted with improved lighting and shelter.  The station was due to be closed between Sunday 31 March and Sunday 5 May 2019 for the works to be completed.  In April, it was reported that the reopening of the station would be delayed due to a fault with supplied components.  Further delays were then caused by issues with signalling.  The station finally reopened in late May 2019.

Connection with the North Norfolk Railway

Between 2007 and 2010, work was undertaken to reinstate the original level crossing across the road to allow trains from Norwich to run onto the North Norfolk Railway (NNR) heritage line tracks. The BBC reported in December 2007 that Network Rail supported the plans to allow occasional crossing of the tracks for trains onto the heritage route. Work began in January 2010 with the moving of the NNR headshunt to slew into line with the National Rail section. The link was reinstated in March 2010 when the first passenger train over the new crossing was steam locomotive ‘Oliver Cromwell’, hauling a train from London Liverpool Street. Occasional uses by charter trains and visiting rolling stock are anticipated not to exceed 12 times a year.

The North Norfolk Railway also operate a number of dining trains over the entire surviving section of the M&GN, between Holt and Cromer, during Summer months.  Services began in 2016, working in partnership with the North Yorkshire Moors Railway, who were already a licensed operator on Network Rail. These services do not stop at the Network Rail station.

References

External links 

Sheringham
Railway stations in Norfolk
DfT Category F1 stations
Railway stations opened by British Rail
Railway stations in Great Britain opened in 1967
Greater Anglia franchise railway stations